“Soul Song” is a song written by George Richey, Billy Sherrill and Norro Wilson and first recorded by Tanya Tucker as a track for her 1972 debut album Delta Dawn.

Background
The song also represented a first for co-writer Norro Wilson: a No. 1 hit as a producer. Wilson had previously written several songs that topped Billboard magazine’s Hot Country Singles chart—notably, David Houston’s “Baby, Baby (I Know You’re a Lady),” and Tammy Wynette’s “He Loves Me All the Way” and “My Man (Understands).” During the next three decades, Wilson produced numerous No. 1 hits (including two more by Stampley), including Margo Smith, Charley Pride, Janie Fricke, Chely Wright, Kenny Chesney and Reba McEntire.

Joe Stampley recording
The song was later recorded by American country music singer Joe Stampley.  It was released in September 1972 as the first single and title track from the album Soul Song,  The song was Stampley's first No. 1 song,

Charts

Weekly charts

Year-end charts

References

Sources
[ Allmusic — Soul Song]
Roland, Tom, "The Billboard Book of Number One Country Hits" (Billboard Books, Watson-Guptill Publications, New York, 1991)

1972 singles
Joe Stampley songs
Songs written by Billy Sherrill
Songs written by Norro Wilson
Songs written by George Richey
Song recordings produced by Norro Wilson
Dot Records singles
1972 songs